The city of Ottawa, Canada held municipal elections on November 12, 1991.

Right wing Britannia Ward councillor Jacquelin Holzman defeated left wing St. George's councillor Nancy Smith and mayor Marc Laviolette. Holzman ran on a platform to "keep a lid on city taxes".<ref>Ottawa Citizen, Nov 13, 1991, pg A1, "It's Mayor Holzman"</ref>

Mayor

City council

Ottawa Board of Education Trustees

ReferencesOttawa Citizen, November 13, 1991''

Municipal elections in Ottawa
1991 Ontario municipal elections
1991 elections in Canada
1990s in Ottawa
November 1991 events in Canada